Prievaly is a village and municipality in Senica District in the Trnava Region of western Slovakia.

History
In historical records the village was first mentioned in 1439.

Geography
The municipality lies at an altitude of 250 metres and covers an area of 15.007 km2. It has a population of about 906 people.

References

External links

 Official page
Prievaly at the Statistical Office of the Slovak Republic

Villages and municipalities in Senica District